Höðr (often anglicized as Hod, Hoder, or Hodur) is a god in Norse mythology. The blind son of Odin and Frigg, he is tricked and guided by Loki into shooting a mistletoe arrow which was to slay the otherwise invulnerable Baldr.

According to the Prose Edda and the Poetic Edda, the goddess Frigg, Baldr's mother, made everything in existence swear never to harm Baldr, except for the mistletoe, which she found too unimportant to ask (alternatively, which she found too young to demand an oath from). The gods amused themselves by trying weapons on Baldr and seeing them fail to do any harm. Loki, the mischief-maker, upon finding out about Baldr's one weakness, made a spear from mistletoe, and helped Höðr shoot it at Baldr. In reaction to this, Odin and the giantess Rindr gave birth to Váli, who grew to adulthood within a day and slew Höðr.

The Danish historian Saxo Grammaticus recorded an alternative version of this myth in his Gesta Danorum. In this version, the mortal hero Høtherus and the demi-god Balderus compete for the hand of Nanna. Ultimately, Høtherus slays Balderus.

Name 
According to scholar Andy Orchard, the theonym Hǫðr can be translated as 'warrior'. Jan de Vries and Vladimir Orel write that is comparable with Old Norse hǫð ('war, slaughter'), and related to Old English heaðu-deór ('brave, stout in war'), from Proto-Germanic *haþuz ('battle'; cf. Old High German hadu-, Old Saxon hathu-, Old Frisian -had, Burgundian *haþus).

The Prose Edda
In the Gylfaginning part of Snorri Sturluson's Prose Edda Höðr is introduced in an ominous way.

Höðr is not mentioned again until the prelude to Baldr's death is described. All things except the mistletoe (believed to be harmless) have sworn an oath not to harm Baldr, so the Æsir throw missiles at him for sport.

The Gylfaginning does not say what happens to Höðr after this. In fact it specifically states that Baldr cannot be avenged, at least not immediately.

It does seem, however, that Höðr ends up in Hel one way or another for the last mention of him in Gylfaginning is in the description of the post-Ragnarök world.

Snorri's source of this knowledge is clearly Völuspá as quoted below.

In the Skáldskaparmál section of the Prose Edda several kennings for Höðr are related.

None of those kennings, however, are actually found in surviving skaldic poetry. Neither are Snorri's kennings for Váli, which are also of interest in this context.

It is clear from this that Snorri was familiar with the role of Váli as Höðr's slayer, even though he does not relate that myth in the Gylfaginning prose. Some scholars have speculated that he found it distasteful, since Höðr is essentially innocent in his version of the story.

The Poetic Edda

Höðr is referred to several times in the Poetic Edda, always in the context of Baldr's death. The following strophes are from Völuspá.

This account seems to fit well with the information in the Prose Edda, but here the role of Baldr's avenging brother is emphasized.

Baldr and Höðr are also mentioned in Völuspás description of the world after Ragnarök.

The poem Vafþrúðnismál informs us that the gods who survive Ragnarök are Viðarr, Váli, Móði and Magni with no mention of Höðr and Baldr.

The myth of Baldr's death is also referred to in another Eddic poem, Baldrs draumar.

Höðr is not mentioned again by name in the Eddas. He is, however, referred to in Völuspá in skamma.

Skaldic poetry

The name of Höðr occurs several times in skaldic poetry as a part of warrior-kennings. Thus Höðr brynju, "Höðr of byrnie", is a warrior and so is Höðr víga, "Höðr of battle". Some scholars have found the fact that the poets should want to compare warriors with Höðr to be incongruous with Snorri's description of him as a blind god, unable to harm anyone without assistance. It is possible that this indicates that some of the poets were familiar with other myths about Höðr than the one related in Gylfaginning – perhaps some where Höðr has a more active role. On the other hand, the names of many gods occur in kennings and the poets might not have been particular in using any god name as a part of a kenning.

Gesta Danorum

In Gesta Danorum Hotherus''' is a human hero of the Danish and Swedish royal lines. He is gifted in swimming, archery, fighting and music and Nanna, daughter of King Gevarus falls in love with him. But at the same time Balderus, son of Othinus, has caught sight of Nanna bathing and fallen violently in love with her. He resolves to slay Hotherus, his rival.

Out hunting, Hotherus is led astray by a mist and meets wood-maidens who control the fortunes of war. They warn him that Balderus has designs on Nanna but also tell him that he shouldn't attack him in battle since he is a demigod. Hotherus goes to consult with King Gevarus and asks him for his daughter. The king replies that he would gladly favour him but that Balderus has already made a like request and he does not want to incur his wrath.

Gevarus tells Hotherus that Balderus is invincible but that he knows of one weapon which can defeat him, a sword kept by Mimingus, the satyr of the woods. Mimingus also has another magical artifact, a bracelet that increases the wealth of its owner. Riding through a region of extraordinary cold in a carriage drawn by reindeer, Hotherus captures the satyr with a clever ruse and forces him to yield his artifacts.

Hearing about Hotherus's artifacts, Gelderus, king of Saxony, equips a fleet to attack him. Gevarus warns Hotherus of this and tells him where to meet Gelderus in battle. When the battle is joined, Hotherus and his men save their missiles while defending themselves against those of the enemy with a testudo formation. With his missiles exhausted, Gelderus is forced to sue for peace. He is treated mercifully by Hotherus and becomes his ally. Hotherus then gains another ally with his eloquent oratory by helping King Helgo of Hålogaland win a bride.

Meanwhile, Balderus enters the country of king Gevarus armed and sues for Nanna. Gevarus tells him to learn Nanna's own mind. Balderus addresses her with cajoling words but is refused. Nanna tells him that because of the great difference in their nature and stature, since he is a demigod, they are not suitable for marriage.

As news of Balderus's efforts reaches Hotherus, he and his allies resolve to attack Balderus. A great naval battle ensues where the gods fight on the side of Balderus. Thoro in particular shatters all opposition with his mighty club. When the battle seems lost, Hotherus manages to hew Thoro's club off at the haft and the gods are forced to retreat. Gelderus perishes in the battle and Hotherus arranges a funeral pyre of vessels for him. After this battle Hotherus finally marries Nanna.

Balderus is not completely defeated and shortly afterwards returns to defeat Hotherus in the field. But Balderus's victory is without fruit for he is still without Nanna. Lovesick, he is harassed by phantoms in Nanna's likeness and his health deteriorates so that he cannot walk but has himself drawn around in a cart.

After a while Hotherus and Balderus have their third battle and again Hotherus is forced to retreat. Weary of life because of his misfortunes, he plans to retire and wanders into the wilderness. In a cave he comes upon the same maidens he had met at the start of his career. Now they tell him that he can defeat Balderus if he gets a taste of some extraordinary food which had been devised to increase the strength of Balderus.

Encouraged by this, Hotherus returns from exile and once again meets Balderus in the field. After a day of inconclusive fighting, he goes out during the night to spy on the enemy. He finds where Balderus's magical food is prepared and plays the lyre for the maidens preparing it. While they don't want to give him the food, they bestow on him a belt and a girdle which secure victory.

Heading back to his camp, Hotherus meets Balderus and plunges his sword into his side. After three days, Balderus dies from his wound. Many years later, Bous, the son of Othinus and Rinda, avenges his brother by killing Hotherus in a duel.

Chronicon Lethrense and Annales Lundenses
There are also two lesser-known DanishLatin chronicles, the Chronicon Lethrense and the Annales Lundenses, of which the latter is included in the former. These two sources provide a second euhemerized account of Höðr's slaying of Balder.

It relates that Hother was the king of the Saxons, son of Hothbrod, the daughter of Hadding. Hother first slew Othen's (i.e., Odin's) son Balder in battle and then chased Othen and Thor. Finally, Othen's son Both killed Hother. Hother, Balder, Othen, and Thor were incorrectly considered to be gods.

Rydberg's theories
According to the Swedish mythologist and romantic poet Viktor Rydberg, the story of Baldr's death was taken from Húsdrápa, a poem composed by Ulfr Uggason around 990 AD at a feast thrown by the Icelandic Chief Óláfr Höskuldsson to celebrate the finished construction of his new home, Hjarðarholt, the walls of which were filled with symbolic representations of the Baldr myth among others. Rydberg suggested that Höðr was depicted with eyes closed and Loki guiding his aim to indicate that Loki was the true cause of Baldr's death and Höðr was only his "blind tool." Rydberg theorized that the author of the Gylfaginning then mistook the description of the symbolic artwork in the Húsdrápa as the actual tale of Baldr's death.

Notes

References

Sources

 Bellows, Henry Adams (trans.) (1936). The Poetic Edda. Princeton: Princeton University Press. Available online
 Brodeur, Arthur Gilchrist (transl.) (1916). The Prose Edda by Snorri Sturluson. New York: The American-Scandinavian Foundation. Available online in parallel text
 Dronke, Ursula (ed. and trans.) (1997) The Poetic Edda: Mythological Poems. Oxford: Oxford University Press. .
 Eysteinn Björnsson (2001). Lexicon of Kennings : The Domain of Battle. Published online: https://web.archive.org/web/20090328200122/http://www3.hi.is/~eybjorn/ugm/kennings/kennings.html
 Eysteinn Björnsson (ed.). Snorra-Edda: Formáli & Gylfaginning : Textar fjögurra meginhandrita. 2005. Published online: https://web.archive.org/web/20080611212105/http://www.hi.is/~eybjorn/gg/
 Eysteinn Björnsson (ed.). Völuspá. Published online: https://web.archive.org/web/20090413124631/http://www3.hi.is/~eybjorn/ugm/vsp3.html
 Guðni Jónsson (ed.) (1949). Eddukvæði : Sæmundar Edda. Reykjavík: Íslendingasagnaútgáfan. Available online
 
 
 
 Thorpe, Benjamin (transl.) (1866). Edda Sæmundar Hinns Froða : The Edda Of Sæmund The Learned''. (2 vols.) London: Trübner & Co. Available online at Google Books

External links

MyNDIR (My Norse Digital Image Repository) Illustrations of Höðr from manuscripts and early print books. Clicking on the thumbnail will give you the full image and information concerning it.

Æsir
Mythological blind people
Sons of Odin
Killed deities
Norse gods
Baldr